The 1963–64 Toronto Maple Leafs season was Toronto's 47th season in the National Hockey League (NHL) and involved winning their 12th Stanley Cup.

Offseason

Regular season 
On November 8, 1963: Maple Leaf Gardens would be the first arena in the NHL to have separate penalty boxes.

Season standings

Record vs. opponents

Schedule and results 

|- align="center" bgcolor="#CCFFCC"
|1||W||October 12, 1963||5–1 || align="left"|  Boston Bruins (1963–64) ||1–0–0||2
|- align="center" bgcolor="#FFBBBB"
|2||L||October 13, 1963||2–4 || align="left"| @ Chicago Black Hawks (1963–64) ||1–1–0||2
|- align="center" bgcolor="#CCFFCC"
|3||W||October 16, 1963||4–2 || align="left"| @ Montreal Canadiens (1963–64) ||2–1–0||4
|- align="center" bgcolor="#CCFFCC"
|4||W||October 19, 1963||2–1 || align="left"|  Detroit Red Wings (1963–64) ||3–1–0||6
|- align="center" bgcolor="#FFBBBB"
|5||L||October 20, 1963||2–3 || align="left"| @ Detroit Red Wings (1963–64) ||3–2–0||6
|- align="center" bgcolor="#CCFFCC"
|6||W||October 26, 1963||6–4 || align="left"|  New York Rangers (1963–64) ||4–2–0||8
|- align="center" bgcolor="#FFBBBB"
|7||L||October 27, 1963||0–2 || align="left"| @ Boston Bruins (1963–64) ||4–3–0||8
|- align="center" bgcolor="#CCFFCC"
|8||W||October 30, 1963||6–3 || align="left"|  Montreal Canadiens (1963–64) ||5–3–0||10
|-

|- align="center" bgcolor="#FFBBBB"
|9||L||November 2, 1963||0–2 || align="left"|  Chicago Black Hawks (1963–64) ||5–4–0||10
|- align="center" bgcolor="#CCFFCC"
|10||W||November 7, 1963||4–3 || align="left"| @ Boston Bruins (1963–64) ||6–4–0||12
|- align="center"
|11||T||November 9, 1963||3–3 || align="left"|  Chicago Black Hawks (1963–64) ||6–4–1||13
|- align="center"
|12||T||November 13, 1963||2–2 || align="left"| @ Montreal Canadiens (1963–64) ||6–4–2||14
|- align="center" bgcolor="#CCFFCC"
|13||W||November 14, 1963||5–4 || align="left"| @ New York Rangers (1963–64) ||7–4–2||16
|- align="center" bgcolor="#CCFFCC"
|14||W||November 16, 1963||5–4 || align="left"|  New York Rangers (1963–64) ||8–4–2||18
|- align="center" bgcolor="#FFBBBB"
|15||L||November 17, 1963||0–6 || align="left"| @ Chicago Black Hawks (1963–64) ||8–5–2||18
|- align="center" bgcolor="#FFBBBB"
|16||L||November 20, 1963||1–3 || align="left"|  Montreal Canadiens (1963–64) ||8–6–2||18
|- align="center" bgcolor="#CCFFCC"
|17||W||November 23, 1963||4–1 || align="left"|  Boston Bruins (1963–64) ||9–6–2||20
|- align="center"
|18||T||November 24, 1963||3–3 || align="left"| @ New York Rangers (1963–64) ||9–6–3||21
|- align="center" bgcolor="#FFBBBB"
|19||L||November 28, 1963||0–2 || align="left"| @ Chicago Black Hawks (1963–64) ||9–7–3||21
|- align="center"
|20||T||November 30, 1963||1–1 || align="left"|  Detroit Red Wings (1963–64) ||9–7–4||22
|-

|- align="center" bgcolor="#CCFFCC"
|21||W||December 1, 1963||4–1 || align="left"| @ Detroit Red Wings (1963–64) ||10–7–4||24
|- align="center" bgcolor="#CCFFCC"
|22||W||December 4, 1963||3–0 || align="left"|  Montreal Canadiens (1963–64) ||11–7–4||26
|- align="center" bgcolor="#CCFFCC"
|23||W||December 7, 1963||3–0 || align="left"|  Chicago Black Hawks (1963–64) ||12–7–4||28
|- align="center" bgcolor="#CCFFCC"
|24||W||December 8, 1963||5–3 || align="left"| @ Detroit Red Wings (1963–64) ||13–7–4||30
|- align="center" bgcolor="#FFBBBB"
|25||L||December 11, 1963||1–3 || align="left"|  Detroit Red Wings (1963–64) ||13–8–4||30
|- align="center" bgcolor="#CCFFCC"
|26||W||December 14, 1963||5–3 || align="left"|  New York Rangers (1963–64) ||14–8–4||32
|- align="center"
|27||T||December 15, 1963||4–4 || align="left"| @ Boston Bruins (1963–64) ||14–8–5||33
|- align="center" bgcolor="#FFBBBB"
|28||L||December 18, 1963||3–7 || align="left"| @ Montreal Canadiens (1963–64) ||14–9–5||33
|- align="center" bgcolor="#CCFFCC"
|29||W||December 21, 1963||2–0 || align="left"|  Detroit Red Wings (1963–64) ||15–9–5||35
|- align="center"
|30||T||December 22, 1963||1–1 || align="left"| @ New York Rangers (1963–64) ||15–9–6||36
|- align="center" bgcolor="#CCFFCC"
|31||W||December 25, 1963||5–1 || align="left"| @ Boston Bruins (1963–64) ||16–9–6||38
|- align="center" bgcolor="#CCFFCC"
|32||W||December 28, 1963||2–0 || align="left"|  Boston Bruins (1963–64) ||17–9–6||40
|- align="center" bgcolor="#FFBBBB"
|33||L||December 29, 1963||0–2 || align="left"| @ Chicago Black Hawks (1963–64) ||17–10–6||40
|- align="center" bgcolor="#CCFFCC"
|34||W||December 31, 1963||5–4 || align="left"| @ Detroit Red Wings (1963–64) ||18–10–6||42
|-

|- align="center" bgcolor="#CCFFCC"
|35||W||January 4, 1964||3–0 || align="left"|  Chicago Black Hawks (1963–64) ||19–10–6||44
|- align="center" bgcolor="#FFBBBB"
|36||L||January 5, 1964||2–3 || align="left"| @ New York Rangers (1963–64) ||19–11–6||44
|- align="center" bgcolor="#CCFFCC"
|37||W||January 8, 1964||6–1 || align="left"|  Montreal Canadiens (1963–64) ||20–11–6||46
|- align="center" bgcolor="#CCFFCC"
|38||W||January 11, 1964||3–1 || align="left"|  Boston Bruins (1963–64) ||21–11–6||48
|- align="center" bgcolor="#FFBBBB"
|39||L||January 12, 1964||3–6 || align="left"| @ Boston Bruins (1963–64) ||21–12–6||48
|- align="center" bgcolor="#FFBBBB"
|40||L||January 15, 1964||4–5 || align="left"|  New York Rangers (1963–64) ||21–13–6||48
|- align="center" bgcolor="#FFBBBB"
|41||L||January 18, 1964||0–11 || align="left"|  Boston Bruins (1963–64) ||21–14–6||48
|- align="center" bgcolor="#CCFFCC"
|42||W||January 19, 1964||2–0 || align="left"| @ Chicago Black Hawks (1963–64) ||22–14–6||50
|- align="center" bgcolor="#FFBBBB"
|43||L||January 22, 1964||0–3 || align="left"|  Montreal Canadiens (1963–64) ||22–15–6||50
|- align="center"
|44||T||January 25, 1964||1–1 || align="left"|  New York Rangers (1963–64) ||22–15–7||51
|- align="center" bgcolor="#FFBBBB"
|45||L||January 26, 1964||0–2 || align="left"| @ Boston Bruins (1963–64) ||22–16–7||51
|- align="center" bgcolor="#FFBBBB"
|46||L||January 29, 1964||1–2 || align="left"| @ Montreal Canadiens (1963–64) ||22–17–7||51
|-

|- align="center" bgcolor="#CCFFCC"
|47||W||February 1, 1964||5–1 || align="left"|  Boston Bruins (1963–64) ||23–17–7||53
|- align="center"
|48||T||February 2, 1964||2–2 || align="left"| @ Detroit Red Wings (1963–64) ||23–17–8||54
|- align="center" bgcolor="#FFBBBB"
|49||L||February 5, 1964||0–2 || align="left"|  Montreal Canadiens (1963–64) ||23–18–8||54
|- align="center"
|50||T||February 8, 1964||3–3 || align="left"|  Chicago Black Hawks (1963–64) ||23–18–9||55
|- align="center" bgcolor="#FFBBBB"
|51||L||February 9, 1964||1–2 || align="left"| @ Chicago Black Hawks (1963–64) ||23–19–9||55
|- align="center" bgcolor="#FFBBBB"
|52||L||February 12, 1964||0–4 || align="left"| @ Montreal Canadiens (1963–64) ||23–20–9||55
|- align="center" bgcolor="#CCFFCC"
|53||W||February 15, 1964||4–0 || align="left"|  Chicago Black Hawks (1963–64) ||24–20–9||57
|- align="center" bgcolor="#FFBBBB"
|54||L||February 16, 1964||2–4 || align="left"| @ New York Rangers (1963–64) ||24–21–9||57
|- align="center"
|55||T||February 19, 1964||1–1 || align="left"|  Detroit Red Wings (1963–64) ||24–21–10||58
|- align="center" bgcolor="#CCFFCC"
|56||W||February 22, 1964||5–2 || align="left"|  New York Rangers (1963–64) ||25–21–10||60
|- align="center" bgcolor="#CCFFCC"
|57||W||February 23, 1964||4–3 || align="left"| @ New York Rangers (1963–64) ||26–21–10||62
|- align="center" bgcolor="#FFBBBB"
|58||L||February 26, 1964||0–1 || align="left"| @ Montreal Canadiens (1963–64) ||26–22–10||62
|- align="center" bgcolor="#CCFFCC"
|59||W||February 29, 1964||4–1 || align="left"|  Chicago Black Hawks (1963–64) ||27–22–10||64
|-

|- align="center" bgcolor="#FFBBBB"
|60||L||March 1, 1964||3–5 || align="left"| @ Boston Bruins (1963–64) ||27–23–10||64
|- align="center" bgcolor="#FFBBBB"
|61||L||March 3, 1964||2–3 || align="left"| @ Detroit Red Wings (1963–64) ||27–24–10||64
|- align="center"
|62||T||March 4, 1964||4–4 || align="left"|  Boston Bruins (1963–64) ||27–24–11||65
|- align="center" bgcolor="#CCFFCC"
|63||W||March 7, 1964||4–2 || align="left"|  Detroit Red Wings (1963–64) ||28–24–11||67
|- align="center" bgcolor="#FFBBBB"
|64||L||March 8, 1964||3–4 || align="left"| @ Chicago Black Hawks (1963–64) ||28–25–11||67
|- align="center" bgcolor="#CCFFCC"
|65||W||March 11, 1964||1–0 || align="left"|  Montreal Canadiens (1963–64) ||29–25–11||69
|- align="center" bgcolor="#CCFFCC"
|66||W||March 14, 1964||7–3 || align="left"|  New York Rangers (1963–64) ||30–25–11||71
|- align="center" bgcolor="#CCFFCC"
|67||W||March 15, 1964||3–1 || align="left"| @ New York Rangers (1963–64) ||31–25–11||73
|- align="center"
|68||T||March 18, 1964||2–2 || align="left"| @ Montreal Canadiens (1963–64) ||31–25–12||74
|- align="center" bgcolor="#CCFFCC"
|69||W||March 21, 1964||5–3 || align="left"|  Detroit Red Wings (1963–64) ||32–25–12||76
|- align="center" bgcolor="#CCFFCC"
|70||W||March 22, 1964||4–1 || align="left"| @ Detroit Red Wings (1963–64) ||33–25–12||78
|-

Player statistics 
Scoring

Goaltending

Playoffs

Schedule and results 

|- align="center" bgcolor="#FFBBBB"
|1||L||March 26, 1964||0–2 || || align="left" | @ Montreal Canadiens (1963–64) || 0–1
|- align="center" bgcolor="#CCFFCC"
|2||W||March 28, 1964||2–1 || || align="left" | @ Montreal Canadiens (1963–64) || 1–1
|- align="center" bgcolor="#FFBBBB"
|3||L||March 31, 1964||2–3 || || align="left" | Montreal Canadiens (1963–64) || 1–2
|- align="center" bgcolor="#CCFFCC"
|4||W||April 2, 1964||5–3 || || align="left" | Montreal Canadiens (1963–64) || 2–2
|- align="center" bgcolor="#FFBBBB"
|5||L||April 4, 1964||2–4 || || align="left" | @ Montreal Canadiens (1963–64) || 2–3
|- align="center" bgcolor="#CCFFCC"
|6||W||April 7, 1964||3–0 || || align="left" | Montreal Canadiens (1963–64) || 3–3
|- align="center" bgcolor="#CCFFCC"
|7||W||April 9, 1964||3–1 || || align="left" | @ Montreal Canadiens (1963–64) || 4–3
|-

|- align="center" bgcolor="#CCFFCC"
|1||W||April 11, 1964||3–2 || || align="left"| Detroit Red Wings (1963–64) || 1–0
|- align="center" bgcolor="#FFBBBB"
|2||L||April 14, 1964||3–4 || OT || align="left"| Detroit Red Wings (1963–64) || 1–1
|- align="center" bgcolor="#FFBBBB"
|3||L||April 16, 1964||3–4 || || align="left"| @ Detroit Red Wings (1963–64) || 1–2
|- align="center" bgcolor="#CCFFCC"
|4||W||April 18, 1964||4–2 || || align="left"| @ Detroit Red Wings (1963–64) || 2–2
|- align="center" bgcolor="#FFBBBB"
|5||L||April 21, 1964||1–2 || || align="left"| Detroit Red Wings (1963–64) || 2–3
|- align="center" bgcolor="#CCFFCC"
|6||W||April 23, 1964||4–3 || OT || align="left"| @ Detroit Red Wings (1963–64) || 3–3
|- align="center" bgcolor="#CCFFCC"
|7||W||April 25, 1964||4–0 || || align="left"| Detroit Red Wings (1963–64) || 4–3
|-

The final series is famous for the courageous play of Bob Baun. In game six of the Finals, he took a Gordie Howe slapshot on his ankle and had to leave play. He returned in overtime and scored the winning goal. He also played in game seven despite the pain and only after the series was over, was it revealed that he had broken the ankle.

Player statistics 
Scoring

Goaltending

Transactions 
The Maple Leafs were involved in the following transactions during the 1963–64 season.

Trades

Waivers

Draft picks
Toronto's draft picks at the 1963 NHL Amateur Draft held at the Queen Elizabeth Hotel in Montreal, Quebec.

Awards and records 
 Tim Horton, Runner-Up, Norris Trophy

References
 Maple Leafs on Hockey Database
 Maple Leafs on Database Hockey

Stanley Cup championship seasons
Toronto Maple Leafs seasons
Toronto Maple Leafs season, 1963-64
Tor